Viduthalai is a 1986 Tamil-language action heist film, directed by K. Vijayan. It stars Sivaji Ganesan, Rajinikanth and Vishnuvardhan. The film was a box office failure. It is a remake of the 1980 Hindi film Qurbani, which itself was based on the 1972 Italian film The Master Touch.

Plot 
Raja, an expert thief, is in love with Radha, a disco club dancer-cum-singer, who is unaware of Raja's profession. Meanwhile, an evil brother-sister duo, Vikram and Bhairavi is bent on seeking vengeance from Crime boss Sudharshan, who cheated and siphoned Bhairavi's money. The duo hire Raja to break into Sudarshan's treasury and perform the heist. But he was caught by a jovial-cum-shrewd Inspector Rajasingam and awarded 2 years imprisonment, which shocks and devastates Radha.

On the other hand, Amar is an ace crime member in Sudarshan's gang who revolts against Sudarshan. He is a widower with a daughter who is studying in a boarding school. However, before quitting Sudarshan's gang, Amar has committed a crime wearing a mask and Inspector Rajasingam is investigating that case. Once Amar saves Radha from a gang of rowdy bikers. They meet regularly as Radha likes Amar's daughter. Soon Amar begins to love Radha, who does not reciprocate because she still loves Raja. Amar realizes Radha is not interested and does not proceed. Raja completes his jail sentence. While returning, he meets Vikram, who again reminds him of the deal to rob Sudarshan. During the conversation, Amar incidentally reaches the site and a fist fight ensues between Amar and Vikram. While fleeing, Vikram swears revenge against Amar. Thus Raja and Amar meet for the first time. Raja takes Amar to introduce to Radha, but both Radha and Amar pretend as if they do not know each other since they don't want Raja to unnecessarily suspect them.

Later Vikram's goons kidnap Amar's daughter and beat Amar who is hospitalized. In return for Amar and his daughter's safety, Raja agrees to do Vikram's job. He nurses Amar back to normal and soon they turn thick friends. Amar promises Raja he will support him in this one last robbery. They plan to shift to London after the robbery with the money. They concoct a scheme whereby Amar would steal gold bars and jewellery from a safe, then phone the police, let Raja take over, get arrested, get a prison term for about 12 to 18 months. After his release, he will join Amar in the U.S.A. Things go awry as Raja gets arrested for killing Sudarshan while Amar and Radha reach U.S.A with the money. Raja construes that Amar deliberately framed him so that he can get Raja out of the way, and keep all the money (as well as Radha) for himself. Raja escapes from jail and reaches London to apprehend Amar. After a brief tussle between the two, Raja realizes the truth and that Amar did not frame him. Vikram and his goons reach U.S.A to take revenge against Raja and Amar. During the ensuing fight, Amar sacrifices his life to save Raja from getting killed by Vikram.

Cast 
 Rajinikanth as Raja
 Vishnuvardhan as Amar
 Sivaji Ganesan as Inspector Rajasingam
Madhavi as Radha
Vijayakumar as Vikram
K. Balaji as Dayalu
R.N.Sudarshan as Madhanagopal
Y. G. Mahendra as Balu special appearance
Thengai Srinivasan as Stepfather of Raja
 Anuradha as Bhairavi
V. Gopalakrishnan as Inspector of police
C. R. Parthibhan as a comedy drama – Jackson Durai
 Baby Shalini as Shalini
Bindu Ghosh

Production 
Balaji, who saw Qurbani decided to remake it in Tamil. He wanted Rajinikanth to play Feroz Khan's character and Ganesan to play Amjad Khan's character. Sivaji agreed to play the role. The dialogue for the film was written by Aaroor Das.

Soundtrack 
The soundtrack was composed by Chandrabose. Lyrics were by Vaali and Pulamaipithan.

Release and reception 
Kalki printed a favourable review, calling it a return to form for Rajinikanth after a while. Despite this, the film was a box-office bomb.

References

External links 
 

1980s heist films
1980s Tamil-language films
1986 action films
1986 films
Films directed by K. Vijayan
Films scored by Chandrabose (composer)
Films set in London
Films shot in London
Films shot in the United States
Indian action films
Indian heist films
Tamil remakes of Hindi films